Reina Sofia (Queen Sophia) can refer to:
 Queen Sofía of Spain
or several buildings and places named after her:
 Museo Nacional Centro de Arte Reina Sofía
 Tenerife South Airport (Reina Sofía)